Mohammad Khoda Baksh Chowdhury (born 15 August 1952) is a former Inspector General of Police of Bangladesh Police. He is one of the convicts of the 2004 Dhaka grenade attack case.

Education
Chowdhury graduated from the University of Dhaka in 1969.

Career 
Chowdhury joined the Bangladesh Police in 1979. He became superintendent of police of Dhaka Metropolitan Police in 2001. He then served as the CID chief. On 31 October 2006, he was appointed as the DG of Rapid Action Battalion. 2 days later, he was promoted to Inspector General of Police of Bangladesh Police by replacing Anwarul Iqbal. 

Chowdhury served as the president of Bangladesh Police Service Association (BPSA) in 2006.

2004 Dhaka grenade attack case
In July 2011, Chowdhury, along with two other former inspectors general, surrendered before the Dhaka Court of Chief Metropolitan Magistrate for the 2004 Dhaka grenade attack case and were sent to the jail. Chowdhury was released in bail from Dhaka Central Jail in April 2012. While serving as an officer on special duty (OSD), he was sent on forced retirement by the government in July 2017.

In October 2018, Chowdhury was found guilty of misleading the investigation and cooking up the "Joj Mia" story and was sentenced to two years in jail.

References

Living people
1952 births
People from Chittagong District
University of Dhaka alumni
Inspectors General of Police (Bangladesh)
Criminal Investigation Department (Bangladesh) officers